Aach ed Djâjé is a mountain of southwestern Lebanon.

References

Mountains of Lebanon